R9 or R-9 may refer to:

Military
 R-9 Desna, a Soviet ICBM
 , a United States Navy submarine in commission from 1919 to 1931 and from 1941 to 1945

Transportation
 Camai Air, IATA airline code
 R9 (New York City Subway car)
 Radial Road 9 or R-9, an arterial road of Manila, Philippines
 Renault R9, a small French family car

Other uses
 HP roman9, an 8-bit character set with euro sign
 R9 color rendering index value for saturated red
 R9: Explosive when mixed with combustible material, a risk phrase in chemistry
 R9-Arms submachine gun, a black market submachine gun
 R9, a x86-64 register number 9
 R-9, a fictitious starfighter from the game R-Type
 "R-9", a 1985 song by electronic band Cybrotron
 Radeon R9, graphics processing units
 Rohrbaugh R9, a compact pistol
 Ronaldo (Brazilian footballer) (born 1976), retired Brazilian footballer
 'R9', the fan-nickname for the upcoming ninth studio album by Barbadian recording artist Rihanna.

See also 
 Firestone XR-9, a 1940s American helicopter
 9R (disambiguation)